Central Valley Baptist Church is a baptist church located in Manteca, California; centered in between the cities of Stockton and Modesto. Along with the English-language auditorium, the church also houses a Spanish-language ministry, which is sometimes named Iglesia Bautista del Valle Central, other ministries include Filipino-language, Singles, Young Married Couples, Bus/Shuttle, Nursing Home, Youth, and Teen.

References

External links
Church Website

Baptist churches in California
Churches in San Joaquin County, California